Donald Doe may refer to:

 Donald Brian Doe (1920–2005) British archaeologist and architect
 Donald Gerrard Doe, American artist